The modern administrative-territorial structure of Russia is a system of territorial organization which is a product of a centuries-long evolution and reforms.

Early history

The Kievan Rus' as it formed in the 10th century remained a more or less unified realm under the rule of Yaroslav the Wise (d. 1054), but in the later part of the 11th century, it disintegrated into a number of de facto independent and rivaling principalities, the most important of which were Grand Duchy of Galicia and Volhynia, Novgorod Republic, and Grand Duchy of Vladimir and Suzdal.

With the advance of Mongols and establishing of Golden Horde in 1240, many parts of Kievan Rus came under a direct administration of Sarai, while others became its dependencies. The three previously mentioned main centers were established as successors of the Kievan Rus. Most of Kingdom of Galicia–Volhynia however became part of the Grand Duchy of Lithuania and later gradually and completely coming under the direct administration of the Crown of Poland. Novgorod Republic was overran by the time well-established Grand Duchy of Moscow. The grand duchies of Lithuania and Moscow practically divided the former territories of Kievan Rus between each other, both struggling to gain the seat of Metropolitan of Kiev.

From the 13th century, the Russian principalities used an administrative subdivision into uyezds, with each such uyezd being subdivided into several volosts, some areas used division of pyatina. Voivodes were the officials appointed to administer and defend the uyezds.

By the 15th century, the Grand Duchy of Moscow was recognized as a direct successor of the Grand Duchy of Vladimir. It gradually incorporated all left out adjacent smaller duchies such as the Principality of Yaroslavl, Principality of Rostov and successfully conquered the Principality of Nizhny Novgorod-Suzdal, the Principality of Tver as well as the Novgorod Republic. Near the end of the 15th century the Golden Horde fell apart into several smaller khanates and Muscovy for the first time became a sovereign state.

At the start of the 16th century, the Grand Duchy of Moscow managed to annex the Pskov Republic and conquer the Grand Duchy of Ryazan as well as secure number of territories that belonged to the Grand Duchy of Lithuania such as the Upper Oka Principalities and Sloboda Ukraine, thus extending its territory far south. In 1708, the Oka principalities and Sloboda Ukraine were incorporated into the first Kiev Governorate. During the second half of the 16th century, the Grand Duchy of Moscow managed to conquer number of West-Siberian and Volga duchies and khanates such as Kazan Khanate, Siberia Khanate, Astrakhan Khanate, Great Nogai Horde and many others. Some of the territorial acquisitions, however, were lost during the Time of Troubles.

Soon after the Time of Troubles (Treaty of Polyanovka), the Grand Duchy of Moscow was able to recover the Duchy of Smolensk (Smolensk Voivodeship) and later annex territory of Left-bank Ukraine (Truce of Andrusovo).

Prior to the 18th century, the Tsardom of Russia was divided into a system of territorial units called razryads (literally order of units) as part of military reform of 1680.
Moscow Razryad
Sevsk Razryad
Vladimir Razryad
Novgorod Razryad
Kazan Razryad
Smolensk Razryad
Ryazan Razryad
Belgorod Razryad, chartered in 1658 out of the Kiev Voivodeship
Tambov Razryad
Tula Razryad
Tobol Razryad, chartered no later than 1587 (first known Voivodeship)
Tom Razryad
Yenisei Razryad

During the 1680s, the Tsardom of Russia acquired a substantial expansion in Transbaikal after signing the Treaty of Nerchinsk with China (Qing dynasty). By this time (at the end of the 17th century), an extensive territory from Yenisei to the Sea of Okhotsk was secured through colonization. The discovery of the Bering Strait in 1728 confirmed the eastern borders of modern Russia. The eastward advance through Siberia extended the Tobol Razryad transforming it into overstretched territory that was initially in 1708 included into Siberia Governorate.

Imperial Russia

Administrative reforms by Peter the Great
Technically, the territorial-administrative reform started out in the Tsardom of Russia before the Imperial period. On , 1708, in order to improve the manageability of the vast territory of the state, Tsar Peter the Great issued an ukase (edict) dividing Russia into eight administrative divisions, called governorates (guberniyas), which replaced the 166 uyezds and razryads which existed before the reform:
Archangelgorod Governorate
Azov Governorate
Ingermanland Governorate
Kazan Governorate
Kiev Governorate
Moscow Governorate
Siberia Governorate
Smolensk Governorate

The reform of 1708 established neither the borders of the governorates nor their internal divisions. The governorates were defined as the sets of cities and the lands adjacent to those cities. Some older subdivision types also continued to be used. Between 1710 and 1713, all governorates were subdivided into lots, each governed by a landrat. Every governorate was administered by an appointed governor, who also headed a board of landrats. The lots' primary purpose was fiscal, and each one was supposed to cover 5,536 homesteads.

In 1719, Peter enacted another administrative reform to fix the deficiencies of the original system, as the governorates were too big and unmanageable. This reform abolished the system of lots, dividing most of the governorates into provinces, which were further divided into districts.

During this time, territories were frequently reshuffled between the governorates, and new governorates were added to accommodate population growth and territorial expansion.

in 1721 the Russian Empire possessed a multinational population of about 17.5 million population in all administrative districts. Out of the 13.5 million Russians, 5.5 million men were liable to the poll tax; 3 percent of them were townsmen and 97 percent peasants. Of the peasants, 25 percent cultivated church lands, 19 percent state lands, and the remainder worked the estates of some 100,000 families of secular landowners. Russia’s territory of about 4,633,200 square miles (12,000,000 square km) included some recent and valuable acquisitions.

Subsequent reforms
In 1727, soon after Peter the Great's death, Catherine I enacted another reform, which rolled back many of the previous reform's developments. The system of districts was abolished, and the old system of uyezds was restored. A total of 166 uyezds was re-established; together with the newly created uyezds, the Russian Empire had approximately 250.

The reform also reshuffled some territories. Narva Province was transferred from Saint Petersburg Governorate to Revel Governorate; Solikamsk and Vyatka Provinces were transferred from Siberia Governorate to Kazan Governorate; and Uglich and Yaroslavl Provinces were transferred from Saint Petersburg Governorate to Moscow Governorate. In addition, Belgorod, Oryol, and Sevsk Provinces of Kiev Governorate were reconstituted as Belgorod Governorate; and Belozersk, Novgorod, Pskov, Tver, and Velikiye Luki Provinces of Saint Petersburg Governorate were reconstituted as Novgorod Governorate.

The following years saw few changes. In 1728, Ufa Province was transferred from Kazan Governorate to Siberia Governorate, and in 1737, Simbirsk Province was created within Kazan Governorate.

Administrative reforms by Catherine the Great
By 1775, the existing system of administrative divisions proved inefficient, which was further underlined by Pugachev's Rebellion, and Catherine the Great issued a document known as Decree on the Governorates. The second part of the same decree was issued in 1780, which, however, contained very few significant changes with respect to the first part.

A major administrative territorial restructuring of the Russian Empire after vast land acquisition from the Ottoman Empire and Polish–Lithuanian Commonwealth in the late 18th century. The reform saw introduction of the office of viceroy (gosudarev namestnik) which later were transformed into a general governor. Gosudarev namestnik literally means an imperial representative to the land. During the reform several already existing governments (guberniya) were combined under the office of the Russian viceroy and were called namestnichestvo. Those namestnichestvo were introduced onto the expanded territory as well, the only exclusion were the governments of Moscow and Saint Petersburg. In 1796 all namestnichetvo were officially renamed into general governments. General governments exercised a small degree of autonomy as certain laws varied from general government to another.

Reforms in the 19th century

After the abolition of Russian serfdom in 1861, volosts became a unit of peasant's local self-rule. A number of mirs were united into a typical volost, which had an assembly consisting of elected delegates from the mirs. The self-government of the mirs and volosts was tempered by the authority of the police commissaries (stanovoy) and by the power of general oversight given to the nominated "district committees for the affairs of the peasants".

Reforms in the 20th century
By the 1910s, 104 administrative governorate units existed.

Soviet Russia

The Russian SFSR comprised 16 autonomous republics, 5 autonomous oblasts, 10 autonomous okrugs, 6 krais, and 40 oblasts.

Uyezds and volosts were abolished by the Soviet administrative reform of 1923–1929. Raions may be roughly called a modern equivalent of the uyezds, and selsoviets may be considered a modern equivalent of the volosts.

Russian Federation

The subdivision type of Federal District was created in May 2000 by Vladimir Putin as a part of a wider program designed to reassert federal authority. The original division was into seven federal districts, but in 2010 the North Caucasian Federal District was split off from the Southern Federal District, bringing the number to eight. In 2014, the annexation of Crimea resulted in the creation of a new Crimean Federal District, bringing the number to nine, but it was later merged into the Southern Federal District. Amidst the invasion of Ukraine, four southern Ukrainian regions of Donetsk, Kherson, Luhansk and Zaporizhzhia would later be annexed into Russia in 2022 but were not integrated into the Southern Federal District. All of the six regions that are under Russian occupation are internationally recognized as part of Ukraine.

References

Notes

Sources
Сергей Тархов. "Изменение административно-территориального деления России в XIII-XX вв.". "Логос", 2005, No.1.  (Sergey Tarkhov. Changes of the Administrative-Territorial Structure of Russia in the 13th–20th centuries).
Sergei G. Pushkarev. Dictionary of Russian Historical Terms from the Eleventh Century to 1917. New Haven and London, Yale University Press, 1970.

External links

 
18th century in the Russian Empire